Trop v. Dulles, 356 U.S. 86 (1958), was a United States Supreme Court case in which the Court ruled that it was unconstitutional to revoke citizenship as a punishment for a crime. The ruling's reference to "evolving standards of decency" is frequently cited in Eighth Amendment jurisprudence.

Background
Albert Trop was a natural born citizen of the United States who, while serving as a private in the United States Army in 1944, deserted from an Army stockade in Casablanca, Morocco. The next day, he willingly surrendered to an army officer and was taken back to the base, where he was subsequently court-martialed, found guilty, and sentenced to three years at hard labor, forfeiture of pay, and a dishonorable discharge.

In 1952, Trop applied for a passport, which was denied because the Nationality Act of 1940 provided that members of the armed forces of the United States who deserted would lose their citizenship. (A 1944 amendment modified the Act such that a deserter would lose his citizenship only if, on these grounds, he had been dishonorably discharged or dismissed from the military.)

Trop filed suit in US federal courts seeking declaratory judgment that he was a US citizen.

The US district court ruled in favor of the government, and the United States Court of Appeals for the Second Circuit upheld the decision of the district court.

Representation
 Osmond K. Fraenkel argued the cause and filed the briefs for petitioner
 Oscar H. Davis argued the cause for respondents on the original argument, and Solicitor General Rankin on the reargument; with them on the briefs were Warren Olney, III (then Assistant Attorney General) and J. F. Bishop;  Beatrice Rosenberg was also with them on the brief on the re-argument

Decision
The Supreme Court reversed. In the decision, written by Chief Justice Earl Warren, the Court cited Perez v. Brownell, the Court had held that citizenship could be divested in the exercise of the foreign affairs power. However, "denationalization as a punishment is barred by the Eighth Amendment," describing it as "a form of punishment more primitive than torture" as it inflicts the "total destruction of the individual's status in organized society." Further, the Court declared that the Eighth Amendment's meaning of cruel and unusual must change over time and "must draw its meaning from the evolving standards of decency that mark the progress of a maturing society".

Dissenting, Justice Felix Frankfurter noted that desertion from the military can be punished by the death penalty, leading him to ask, "Is constitutional dialectic so empty of reason that it can be seriously urged that loss of citizenship is a fate worse than death?"

See also
 List of United States Supreme Court cases, volume 356

External links
 
 

1958 in United States case law
United States Supreme Court cases
United States Supreme Court cases of the Warren Court
Cruel and Unusual Punishment Clause case law
American Civil Liberties Union litigation